The third season of The Bachelor premiered on 29 July 2015. This season features Sam Wood, a 34-year-old Melbourne-based business owner and personal trainer, and founder of children's fitness company Gecko Kids, originally from Tasmania; courting 21 women.

Contestants
The season began with 19 contestants. In episode 9, two "intruders" were brought into the competition, bringing the total number of contestants to 21.

Call-out order

Color key

Episodes

Episode 1
Original airdate: 29 July 2015

Episode 2
Original airdate: 30 July 2015

Episode 3
Original airdate 5 August 2015

Episode 4
Original airdate: 6 August 2015

Episode 5
Original airdate 12 August 2015

Episode 6
Original airdate: 13 August 2015

Episode 7
Original airdate 19 August 2015

Episode 8
Original airdate 20 August 2015

Episode 9
Original airdate 26 August 2015

Episode 10
Original airdate 27 August 2015

Episode 11
Original airdate 2 September 2015

Episode 12
Original airdate 3 September 2015

Episode 13
Original airdate 9 September 2015

Episode 14
Original airdate 10 September 2015

Episode 15
Original airdate: 16 September 2015

Episode 16

Ratings

References

2015 Australian television seasons
Australian (season 03)
Television shows filmed in Australia